Halomonas subglaciescola is a Gram-negative halophilic bacterium. It was first isolated from an Antarctic, hypersaline, meromictic lake, but has since been found in other environments, such as fermenting seafood. It has a largely oxidative mode of metabolism and it is motile through peritrichous flagellation. This species doesn't utilise glucose, and its type strain is ACAM 12 (= UQM 2926).

References

Further reading

James, S. R., et al. "Seasonal abundance of Halomonas meridiana, Halomonas subglaciescola, Flavobacterium gondwanense and Flavobacterium salegens in four Antarctic lakes." Antarctic science 6.03 (1994): 325–332.

External links

Type strain of Halomonas subglaciescola at BacDive -  the Bacterial Diversity Metadatabase

Oceanospirillales
Bacteria described in 1987